Beni Kalthoum is a village located in Msaken region, Sousse governorate, Tunisia at a distance of  to the south of Msaken.

References

Populated places in Tunisia
Villages in Tunisia
Sousse Governorate